Skulski is a Polish surname. It may refer to:

 Jarosław Skulski (1907–1977), Russian-born Polish film and theatre actor
 Leopold Skulski (1878–1940), prime minister of Poland for six months from 13 December 1919 until 9 June 1920

See also
Skulsk, a village in Konin County, Greater Poland Voivodeship, in west-central Poland
Skulskie Lake, a lake in Gmina Skulsk, Konin County, Greater Poland Voivodeship, north-central Poland, near the village of Skulsk

Polish-language surnames